The Mylius My-103 Mistral is a German two-seat aerobatic trainer of utility aircraft produced by Mylius Flugzeugwerk of Bitburg.

Design and development
The My-103 is a two-seat development of the My-102 Tornado which was itself a development of the MHK-101. The MHK-101 was an early 1970s proof of concept prototype which led to the MBB Bo 209 Monsun, it had been designed by Hermann Mylius the father of Albert Mylius who had founded Mylius Flugzeugwerk in 1996. The first flight of the My-103/200 basic trainer prototype D-ETMY was on 23 May 1998 which was followed by the first pre-production aircraft in July 2001.

The My-103 is an all-metal low-wing monoplane with a fixed tricycle landing gear, the prototype basic trainer had a  Lycoming AEIO-360 flat-four engine. It has two-seats side-by-side with dual controls and a rear-sliding bubble canopy and a fixed windscreen. A four-seat variant the My-104 was proposed but no further aircraft have been built.

Colombian production
Aero Integration & Manufacturing S.A.S. (AIMING) and INDAER announced in July 2013 that the My-103 is in the process of resuming production. Therefore,  the Mylius-103, will be manufactured in Medellin, Colombia near José María Córdova Airport by AIMING and INDAER with new avionics and Colombian engineering and personnel with the support from aircraft designer, Albert Mylius, in Germany. The aircraft is in the process of being certified by the Colombian authorities to be able to offer the My-103 in the market. La nueva apuesta de la industria aérea colombiana: Mylius MY-103

Variants

My-102
Single-seat aerobatic trainer or tourer, two built.
My-103/180
Two-seat basic variant with a  Lycoming IO-360 engine, not built.
My-103/200
Two-seat basic trainer with a  Lycoming AEIO-360 engine, four built.
My-104
Four-seat variant with a  Lycoming IO-360 engine, not built.

Specifications (My-103/200)

See also

References

1990s German civil utility aircraft
Single-engined tractor aircraft
Low-wing aircraft
Aircraft first flown in 1998